The canton of Audincourt is an administrative division of the Doubs department,  eastern France. Its borders were modified at the French canton reorganisation which came into effect in March 2015. Its seat is in Audincourt.

It consists of the following communes:
 
Arbouans
Audincourt
Badevel
Dampierre-les-Bois
Dasle
Hérimoncourt
Seloncourt
Taillecourt
Vandoncourt

References

Cantons of Doubs